Cunnilear Camp is an Iron Age hill fort close to the village of Loxhore in Devon, England.

References

Hill forts in Devon